Kalmar Allmänna Idrottsklubb Fotbollsklubb (Kalmar Common Athletic Club Football Club) is a Swedish football club located in Kalmar.
They play at Fredriksskans.

History 
1903: The sports association Glad Ungdom (Happy Youth) is formed November 22.
1905: Glad Ungdom's new name IK Örnen (IK Eagle) is presented.
1907: IK Falken (IK Falcon) is founded.
1909: IK Örnen is renamed Kalmar Idrottsklubb (Kalmar Athletic Club).
1917: IK Falken and Kalmar Idrottsklubb is merged into one club called Kalmar Allmänna Idrottsklubb, Kalmar AIK.
2000: Kalmar AIK is renaming all of their different sports, and the football club's new name is Kalmar Allmänna Idrottsklubb Fotbollsklubb, Kalmar AIK FK.

Season to season

Current squad (2013) 
As of May 2013

References

External links 
 Kalmar AIK FK – official football site

Football clubs in Kalmar County
Sport in Kalmar
Association football clubs established in 1903
1903 establishments in Sweden